The 1888 Men's tennis season was composed of the thirteenth annual pre-open era season incorporating 51 tournaments.

The season began in April in London, England, and ended in December in Napier, New Zealand.

Season summary
In 1888 the twelfth edition of the 1888 Wimbledon Championships was held, this saw the victory of Ernest Renshaw who defeated the Briton Ernest Wool Lewis in the final of the preliminary tournament by 7–9, 6–1, 8–6, 6–4 . Renshaw then defeated defending champion Herbert Lawford in the challenge round to claim the title for the first time. In the fourth edition of the men's doubles the brothers William Renshaw and Ernest Renshaw regained the title they had not been able to defend the previous year by beating the title holders Herbert Wilberforce and Patrick Bowes-Lyon in the challenge round per 2–6, 1–6, 6–3, 6–4, 6–3.

In 1888 the eighth edition of the Irish Championships was also played where the Briton Ernest Renshaw prevailed who defeated James Willoughby Hamilton 6-4 5-7 6-4 3-6 6–2 in the final. In the U.S. National Championships, (today known as the US Open) held on the grass courts of the Newport Casino in Newport in the United States, the American Henry Slocum prevailed in the men's singles, defeating his compatriot Howard Augustus Taylor in 3 sets in the final of the preliminary tournament with the score of 6-4 6-1 6–0. Richard Sears after his seventh consecutive victory at the US National Championships he no longer participated in the tournament so the victory was awarded to Taylor without playing the challenge round. In addition to the men's singles tournament at the Staten Island Cricket Club in New York, the doubles tournament was also held where Oliver Campbell and Valentine Gill Hall prevailed, beating Edward MacMullen and Clarence Hobart in the final.

In the New South Wales Championships in Sydney, the Australian Dudley Webb prevailed in the men's singles, beating his compatriot Charles W. Cropper in the final. In the British Covered Court Championships in London, one of the earliest tournaments in tennis history to be played on indoor courts, Ernest Lewis prevailed in the men's singles defeating Ernest George Meers.

Calendar 
Included:
Notes 1: Challenge Round: the final round of a tournament, in which the winner of a single-elimination phase faces the previous year's champion, who plays only that one match. The challenge round was used in the early history of tennis (from 1877 through 1921), in some tournaments not all.* Indicates challenger

Notes 2:'This is an incomplete roll of tournaments staged this yearKey

JanuaryNo eventsFebruaryNessun eventoMarch

April

May

June

July

 August 

 September

 October 

NovemberNo events''

December

References

Sources 
 A. Wallis Myers, ed. (1903). Lawn Tennis at Home and Abroad (1st ed.). New York: Charles Scribner's Sons. OCLC 5358651.
 Baily's Monthly Magazine of Sports and Pastimes, and Racing Register, A.H. Baily & Company of Cornhill. London. England. July 1887.
 Collins. Bud, Total Tennis:The Ultimate Tennis Encyclopedia Sport Classic Books, Toronto, Canada, ISBN 0-9731443-4-3 
 Gillmeister, Heiner (1998). Tennis:Cultural History. London: A&C Black. .
 Hall, Valentine Gill (1889). Lawn tennis in America. Biographical sketches of all the prominent players, knotty points, and all the latest rules and directions governing handicaps, umpires, and rules for playing. D. W. Granbery & Co. New York, NY, USA:
 Lake, Robert J. (2014). A Social History of Tennis in Britain: Volume 5 of Routledge Research in Sports History. Routledge:. .
 Mazak, Karoly (2017). The Concise History of Tennis. Independently published. .
 Nauright, John; Parrish, Charles (2012). Sports Around the World: History, Culture, and Practice. Santa Barbara, Calif.: ABC-CLIO. .
 Nieuwland, Alex (2009–2021). "Tournaments – Search for Tournament – Year – 1888". www.tennisarchives.com. Harlingen, Netherlands.
 Paret, Jahial Parmly; Allen, J. P.; Alexander, Frederick B.; Hardy, Samuel [from old catalogue (1918). Spalding's tennis annual . New York, NY, USA: New York, American sports publishing company.
 The Australian Dictionary of Biography (1966–2021). Including a supplementary volume of ‘missing persons’ have, so far, been published. Volumes 1–19. The National Centre of Biography. Australian National University. Canberra. Australia.
 The John Player Nottingham Tennis Tournament: Record of Winners Nottingham Lawn Tennis Tournament (1887–1970)" (PDF).https://www.nottinghamcastleltc.co.uk/history/?d=John+Player+Nottingham+Tennis+Tournament+1971.pdf. Nottingham Castle LTC. Notts Lawn Tennis Association. 7 June 1971. pp. 1–7.

External links 
  https://it.wikipedia.org/wiki/Tornei di tennis maschili nel 1888/1888 mens tennis season Italian wikipedia.

Pre Open era tennis seasons
1888 in tennis